The Traverse City Micropolitan Statistical Area, as defined by the United States Census Bureau, is an area consisting of four counties in Northern Michigan, anchored by the city of Traverse City.

As of the 2020 census, the Traverse City micropolitan area was the sixth largest micropolitan area in the United States with the area having a population of 153,448.

Counties
Benzie
Grand Traverse
Kalkaska
Leelanau

Cities, villages, and townships

Cities

Villages

Townships

Unincorporated places

Demographics
As of the census of 2000, there were 131,342 people, 51,760 households, and 36,176 families residing within the micropolitan area. The racial makeup of the micropolitan area was 96.15% White, 0.33% African American, 1.43% Native American, 0.38% Asian, 0.03% Pacific Islander, 0.60% from other races, and 1.09% from two or more races. Hispanic or Latino of any race were 1.69% of the population.

The median income for a household in the micropolitan area was $40,913, and the median income for a family was $46,772. Males had a median income of $33,148 versus $23,026 for females. The per capita income for the micropolitan area was $20,408.

See also
List of municipalities in Michigan
Michigan statistical areas

References

 
Geography of Benzie County, Michigan
Geography of Grand Traverse County, Michigan
Geography of Kalkaska County, Michigan
Geography of Leelanau County, Michigan